Consort Mountain is on the north side of an unnamed creek that drains eastward into the Snaring River. The origin of the name is unknown. It is located in the Victoria Cross Ranges in Alberta.

See also
Mountains of Alberta

References

Two-thousanders of Alberta
Alberta's Rockies